Francisco Velásquez (17??-18??) was a Dominican painter during the colonial period and one of the few early colonial native artists whose works and legacy survive today. Velásquez is noted as the painter of the twelve apostles that adorn the chapel of the sacrament of the old Cathedral Primada. Known as medallions for their oval shape, his paintings represent apostles Peter, Andrew, James (the son of Zebedee), John, Philip, Bartholomew, Thomas, Matthew, James), Thaddaeus, Simon, and Judas Iscariot.

Biography 
Velásquez was a criollo artist born in Santo Domingo, in the last half of the 18th century and died between 1822 and 1830. Completely self-taught, he painted using crude mixtures of colors that he made using materials from the earth, excelling as a painter of portraits "that he drew without the need to have the person in view at the time of portraying them."  This appreciation is from the biographer José María Morillas who, highlighting Velásquez's talent, explains that in order to make a portrait of Archbishop Valera (1814–1833), who refused to be painted, his relatives “gave him the opportunity to see him while he prayed." Throughout his career, Velásquez painted portraits of more well-to-do and high-ranking people. His fame as a portraitist led him to Haiti, where he was summoned by Henri Christophe, then the ruler of the neighboring nation, between 1806 and 1820; Christophe, members of his family and magnates of the royal court were models of the numerous portraits made by the painter from Santo Domingo, who also decorated the palatial spaces with the theme of mythological gods, reinterpreted "with Ethiopian color and features." The decoration was rewarded with a splendid remuneration given by Christophe, who also told the painter, “that is how the gods must have been". Taking into account that Velásquez developed in the last decades of the changing colonial regime of Santo Domingo (1795-1821), probably many of the portraits from this period are preserved as anonymous paintings, considering he did not sign his works.

He is best known for painting the medallions of the apostles hung in the chapel of the Blessed Sacrament of the Primada Cathedral. They are pictures worked directly on cedar boards, without intermediate technique on the support. In fact, this poor procedure was one of the reasons that led art historians to conjecture that the medallions were painted natively in Santo Domingo as opposed to shipped from Spain. Moreover, these paintings were specifically made for the Chapel of the Blessed Sacrament, considering twelve of them adjust their size to the side walls and the other two that complete the total of fourteen have the measurements required by the back wall.

Additionally, an English chronicler William Walton cites Velásquez's name and his works in a book published in 1810. Walton refers to the paintings of the apostles that he located in the chapel, quoting: "The Chapel of the Sacrament has a small ceiling or cupola painted in sections and is ornamented with large paintings of the twelve apostles by Velásquez, a native painter residing here, whose talent without the help of any school is especially noticeable in the copies of resemblances, which he achieves with the greatest precision imaginable, although his color mixing is crude."

Walton was in the territory of Hispañola, forming part of the military squads that his native country, England, mobilized in the Caribbean when the conflicts related to the Saint Domingue revolution, also known as the Haitian Revolution (1789-1804), arose. This armed conflict heavily involved the area of the Spanish or Dominican Creoles, eventually resulting in the Treaty of Basel (1795) which transferred the Spanish colony to France. This era of the island's history involved various military occupations, among them the army of Napoleon Bonaparte, whose imperialist policy challenged the commercial interests of the English, who reacted with blockades of the armed navy in Europe and military expeditions to the Antillean region. William Walton was part of that English mobilization when he was captured by the French in Santo Domingo. It was during this time that he gathered materials regarding the Spanish colonies for his essay in which he quotes the painter Francisco Velásquez as the creator of the paintings of the twelve apostles located in one of the chapels of the cathedral.

Due to the fact that native artists from the colonies did not sign their works regularly, many of Velasquez's works have been passed down as anonymous works. More information on colonial works and performances perhaps recorded in documents also have been lost due to different destructions that have occurred; for instance, the archives of the Cathedral of Santo Domingo were burned by Francis Drake in the sixteenth century, or disappeared in other periods due to various circumstances. Walton writes that upon the transfer to France (1795) “several convents were abandoned by its inhabitants with the change of flag, remaining in a state of abandonment for several years. The French turned many precincts into barracks, hospitals, warehouses, and a church into a theater. Later they were inhabited by poor people, whose wooden houses were burned and destroyed during the siege. Its wide patios and damp corridors, once traversed by vestals, are now littered with garbage and mold, more from carelessness than from the devastating action of time."

Gallery

References

1750 births
1822 deaths
19th-century Dominican Republic artists
Dominican Republic male artists
Dominican Republic portrait painters
Catholic painters
18th-century Dominican Republic artists
People from Santo Domingo
18th-century artists